Broadmoor Records was a New Orleans, Louisiana, based indie record label. Established by Dave Bartholomew, it was named after his neighborhood Broadmoor, New Orleans.

See also
 List of record labels

American record labels